Drunk with Love (Persian: Masty eshq) is a 1951 Iranian drama film directed by Esmail Kushan.

Cast
 Alexander Bijanian 
 Hossein Daneshavar 
 Ma'soomeh Khakyar 
 Mehdi Maysaghieh
 Habibollah Morad 
 Bahram Siar

References

Bibliography 
 Mohammad Ali Issari. Cinema in Iran, 1900-1979. Scarecrow Press, 1989.

External links 
 

1951 films
1950s Persian-language films
Iranian black-and-white films
Films directed by Esmail Kushan
Iranian drama films
1951 drama films